Wahi or wahy is the Arabic word for revelation in the context of Islam.

Wahi, Vahi,  WAHI, or WaHI may also refer to:
Vahi, a tribe of the Turu people from north-central Tanzania
Web Automated Human Interaction (Wahi), a communication technology from Wahi Media, Inc.
WaHI, or "Washington Heights and Inwood", two neighborhoods in Upper Manhattan, New York City
WAHI, ICAO code for Yogyakarta International Airport

People
Adita Wahi (born ?), an Indian actress and model
Karan Wahi (born 1986), an Indian actor and host
Purshottam Lal Wahi (born 1928), an Indian cardiologist
Satya Pal Wahi (born 1950), former chairman of ONGC
Rakesh Wahi (born 1975), an Indian businessman and army veteran

See also
Wahi grosbeak